Kheyrabad (also Romanized as Kheyrābād) is a village in Abreis Rural District, Bazman District, Iranshahr County, Sistan and Baluchestan Province, Iran. At the 2006 census, its population was 91, in 25 families.

References 

Populated places in Iranshahr County